The Men's 5000 metres at the 2014 Commonwealth Games, as part of the athletics programme, was held at Hampden Park on 27 July 2014.

Results

References

Men's 5000 metres
2014